Tomáš Vincour (born November 19, 1990) is a Czech professional ice hockey player who is currently playing for HC Kometa Brno in the Czech Extraliga (ELH). He has previously played in the National Hockey League for the Dallas Stars, who selected him in the fifth round of the 2009 NHL Entry Draft, and the Colorado Avalanche.

Playing career
He was selected by the Dallas Stars in the 5th round (129th overall) of the 2009 NHL Entry Draft and was the first ever Oil King to be drafted by an NHL team. Vincour graduated at Salisbury Composite High School in Sherwood Park, Alberta. Previously to starting his major junior career in North America, Vincour played four games with HC Kometa Brno as a youth in the 1. národní hokejová liga during the 2006–07 season.

Vincour made his NHL debut with the Dallas Stars during the 2010–11 season on February 9, 2011. He became the first alumnus of the modern incarnation Edmonton Oil Kings to play in the NHL. Vincour scored his first NHL goal on March 9, 2011 in a game against the Calgary Flames' Miikka Kiprusoff. He was assisted by Toby Petersen and Jeff Woywitka.

During the lockout shortened 2012–13 season, Vincour was traded by the Stars to the Colorado Avalanche in exchange for Cameron Gaunce on April 2, 2013. Reassigned to Avalanche affiliate, the Lake Erie Monsters, Vincour immediately made an offensive impact to lead all Monsters in scoring post trade with 11 points in 6 games. Upon the conclusion of Lake Erie's season, he was recalled to make his Avalanche debut in a defeat against the St. Louis Blues on April 23, 2013.

As a restricted free agent of the Avalanche at season's end, Vincour opted to sign a one-year contract in Russia with Ak Bars Kazan of the Kontinental Hockey League on June 18, 2013. In the 2013–14 season, Vincour secured a role in the third line for Kazan. He contributed with 6 goals in 11 points in 39 games before leaving Kazan at season's end to return to his original Czech club, after 7 seasons abroad, with HC Kometa Brno on August 14, 2014.

Vincour's tenure with the Comets was short lived, as on August 29, 2014, Vincour activated his NHL out-clause after he was unexpectedly contacted and offered a contract by the Avalanche to return to North America for the 2014–15 season. Vincour suffered an early injury and was reassigned to the Lake Erie Monsters to begin his 2014–15 season. He was recalled to the Avalanche and played in 7 games for 1 assist before he was returned to finish the year with the Monsters.

On August 18, 2015, as a free agent from the Avalanche, Vincour returned to the KHL, signing a one-year contract with HC Sibir Novosibirsk. In the 2015–16 season, Vincour set new KHL marks in recording 27 points in 45 games. As a free agent at the conclusion of the season, Vincour opted to return hometown club, HC Kometa Brno of the Czech ELH on August 5, 2016.

After two seasons with Brno, capturing the Czech Championship in each campaign, Vincour left the club as a free agent and signed a two-year contract to remain in the ELH with Mountfield HK on July 13, 2018.

International play
Vincour debuted for the Czech Republic in a game against Slovakia. This game took place in Bratislava (Slovakia) and the Czech Republic's team won after a penalty shoot out. Vincour assisted on Holík's equalizer.

Career statistics

Regular season and playoffs

International

References

External links

1990 births
Living people
Ak Bars Kazan players
Colorado Avalanche players
Czech ice hockey right wingers
Dallas Stars draft picks
Dallas Stars players
Edmonton Oil Kings players
HC Kometa Brno players
Lake Erie Monsters players
Stadion Hradec Králové players
HC Sibir Novosibirsk players
Ice hockey people from Brno
Texas Stars players
Vancouver Giants players
Czech expatriate ice hockey players in Canada
Czech expatriate ice hockey players in Russia
Czech expatriate ice hockey players in the United States